The Dasynini are a tribe of leaf-footed bugs, in the subfamily Coreinae erected by Bergroth in 1913.  Genera are distributed from Africa, Asia to Australia.

Genera 

The Coreoidea Species File lists:
 Amblypelta Stål, 1873
 Anadasynus China, 1934
 Aulacosterjanus Brailovsky, 2002
 Aulacosternum Dallas, 1852
 Chinadasynus Hsiao, 1964
 Dasynopsis Hsiao, 1963
 Dasynus Burmeister, 1834
 Dicorymbus Bergroth, 1918
 Galaesus Dallas, 1852
 Jalina Distant, 1911
 Jalinoides Dolling, 1974
 Madagalaesus Brailovsky, 2007
 Odontoparia Mayr, 1865
 Paradasynus China, 1934
 Piramurana Distant, 1911
 Piramuranoides Dolling, 1974
 Pseudopendulinus Schouteden, 1938
 Sinodasynus Hsiao, 1963
 Theraptus Stål, 1860
 Xenoceraea Bergroth, 1918

References

External links
 
 

Hemiptera tribes
Coreinae